Russian dialects are spoken variants of the Russian language.

Russian dialects and territorial varieties are divided in two conceptual chronological and geographic categories:

 The dialects of the territory of the primary formation, which consist of "Old" Russia of the 16th century (before the Eastern conquests by Ivan the Terrible) and roughly correlate with the modern Central and Northwestern Federal districts. These "historical dialects" are claimed as ethnically Russian (Russkii).
 The dialects of the territory of the second formation, where Russians settled after the 16th century. These new territorial varieties were produced by the Russian and Soviet imperial expansions during the last centuries and are mainly spoken by non-Slavic, non-Slavophone, and non-Orthodox populations in post-Soviet states.

In Russia 

Depending on the presence or the absence of vowel reduction (akanye and/or ikanye) and the pronunciation of Proto-Slavic *g, Russian is divided into two main dialectical divisions and the intermediate one:
Northern, in the northern and north-eastern parts of European Russia, from Veliky Novgorod to the Perm and northern Ural regions; this has no or little vowel reduction in unstressed positions and stop .
Southern, in the western and southern parts of European Russia; this has various types of vowel reduction and fricative ; this group makes up a dialect continuum with Belarusian, although it differs significantly from the Ukrainian dialects to the further south, sharing only a few isoglosses (namely the fricative pronunciation of Proto-Slavic *g). This is due to the fact that the Russian-Ukrainian linguistic boundary has only existed since the expansion of both of these languages into the steppes, at which time they were already markedly different.

The dialects of the southern Ural, Siberia and the Far East may be of all three groups, depending on where the settlers from European Russia came from. The dialects of the Lower Don and the Northern Caucasus are of the Southern Russian origin.

Dialects within Russia

Northern Russian 
 Pomor (Arkhangelsk and Murmansk)
 Ladoga-Tikhvin
 Transitional groups: Onega, Lacha, Belozersk-Bezhetsk 
 Vologda
 Kostroma-Yaroslavl

Central or Middle Russian 
 Western
 Groups with okanye (Gdov, Luga, Novgorod, Staraya Russa, Valday)
 Groups with akanye (Pskov, Velikiye Luki, Toropets, Rzhev, Torzhok)
 Eastern
 Groups with okanye (Tver, Klin, Sergiev Posad, Vladimir, Suzdal, Rostov, Ivanovo, Murom, Nizhny Novgorod)
 Groups with akanye (Moscow, Kasimov, Temnikov)
 Chukhloma enclave (with akanye)

Bashkort Russian 
Bashkort Russian is characterised by the adoption of native Bashkir and Tatar words such as айда replacing давай to mean "let's go". It is primarily spoken in the Republic of Bashkortostan, which is an autonomous region of Russia.

Lake Peipus 

Lake Peipus dialect (Russian: Причудский говор) is a Russian language variety spoken on both sides of the Lake Peipus in Pskov Oblast, Russia and some counties of Estonia where Russian is a frequently-spoken or dominant language. It originated as a mix of Pskov and Gdov dialects of the Central Russian cluster. As many other dialects from this area, it is often considered to be transitional between Russian and Belarusian. Lake Peipus dialects also include some loanwords from the Estonian language.

The dialect has been studied and described by Olga Rovnova of the University of Tartu who has conducted fieldwork in Russian Old Believers' communities in Estonia.

Southern Russian 
 Western (Bryansk, Smolensk, southern parts of Pskov and Tver)
 Transitional group A (Mosalsk, Kozelsk, Zhizdra, Karachev, Sevsk, Rylsk)
 Central (Belgorod, Kursk, Oryol)
 Transitional group B (Serpukhov, Kolomna, Kaluga, Tula, Elets, Stary Oskol)
 Eastern (Lipetsk, Tambov, Ryazan, Voronezh).

Astrakhani Russian 

Astrakhani Russian is a collection of varieties of Russian spoken in the Astrakhan Oblast, predominantly by the ethnically mixed population — ethnic Russians (61%), Kazakhs (17%), Tatars (7%) among the main speakers, and include many other groups such as Azeris, "Dagestani" (by self-identification according to the 2010 census), Nogay, and Ukrainians.

Like Dagestani Russian, Astrakhan Russian refers to many different dialects varying depending on a speaker's native language, ethnicity, age, occupation, and other social factors. Even in the metropolitan area of Astrakhan where a person of a minority background is likely to grow up speaking only Russian, traces of their heritage language are still present.

Cossack Russian

Balachka 

Balachka is spoken in the Kuban region of Russia, by the Kuban Cossacks. The Kuban Cossacks being descendants of the Zaporozhian Cossacks are beginning to consider themselves as a separate ethnic identity. Their dialect is based on Middle Dnieprian with the Ukrainian grammar. It includes dialectical words of central Ukrainian with frequent inclusion of Russian vocabulary, in particular for modern concepts and items. It varies somewhat from one area to another.

Isoglosses 

Notes

Eastern Europe

Moldovan Russian 

It is also characterized by Romanian loanwords. This change is also widely accepted by Russian-language media inside of Russia, as well. Russian is more often used as a second language and as the language of interethnic communication than as a first language in the country, which contributes to influence from the state language, Romanian.

Ukrainian Russian

Odesan Russian 

The Russian language as spoken in Odesa is influenced by Yiddish and Ukrainian in grammar, vocabulary, and phraseology. As a result, many phrases sound inherently and uniquely humorous to Russian speakers and constitute a staple of Odesa humour. Also, the Odesa dialect of Yiddish has plenty of Russianisms.

Belarusian Russian

Caucasus

Abkhaz Russian 
Abkhaz Russian is characterised by the use of Abkhaz terms, orthographical differences, and patterns of speech that diverge from that of Standard Russian.

Chechen Russian 
Notable variety features include use of /u/ <у> in place of /v/ <в>, such as in <привет>, pronounced /priuet/ [приуэт]. Additionally, дон is used as a filler word, similar to ну or короче in standard Russian.

Dagestani Russian 

Dagestani Russian (Russian: Дагестанский русский) is a regional variety of the Russian language spoken in Dagestan, a constituent republic of the Russian Federation, and some of the neighboring regions including Astrakhan Oblast and Kalmykia. It is characterized by heavy influence from vernacular languages, mostly those belonging to the Northeast Caucasian and Turkic language families. It is considered a low prestige language and mostly used in informal domains. By some measures, it is considered an ethnolect.

Armenian Russian 

Armenian Russian is the regional variety of Russian spoken in Armenia and the partially-recognised Republic of Artsakh (as Artsakhi (Armenian) Russian), where parliament voted to establish Russian an official language in March 2021.

There are some vocabulary differences to the variety of Russian as spoken in Armenia/Artsakh, such as:

Central Asia

Kazakhstani Russian 

Most key word differences come in the form of toponyms of renamed cities after the 1991 independence of Kazakhstan. Not all renamings are manifested in the Russian language, such as with the city of Almaty, still known by its former name of Alma-Ata in Russian, because they sound similar. Other differences include names for authorities such as мажилис, мажилисмен which substitute the Russian word депутат. Акимат is a localised Russian construction of the borrowed word Аким, meaning "mayor", and given the traditional -ат suffix in standard Russian that is used for words such as секретариат and ректорат. Kazakhstani Russian is often classified as being influenced strongly by Kazakh and the use of Kazakh words.

Kyrgyzstani Russian 

Kyrgyzstani Russian is characterised by phonetic differences as well as the use of some words from the Kyrgyz language. There are also some other differences in vocabulary, such as  replacing the standard  meaning "mobile phone".

Tajikistani Russian 
The varieties of Russian spoken in Tajikistan are collectively referred to as Tajik(istani) Russian. Both Russian (official interethnic) and Tajik (state language) are official languages of Tajikistan and their usages often influence each other. 

Tajik words and expressions are often found in the colloquial speech of Tajikistani Russian speakers, especially in Dushanbe, although qualitatively, Russian borrowings into Tajik exceed the reverse. The varieties are greatly affected by Russian-speaking families, intermarriages between different nationalities, Russian-language classrooms, and location.

Tajik-borrowed lexical units have entered Russian at various times and contexts that they may sometimes be attributed to the overall Eastern Iranian dialect continuum. For example the words душман, духан which passed to Russian through Tajik during the Soviet-Afghan War.

The colloquial lexicon also includes words such as: алча, дастархан, джигит, казан, кайф, карбос, кишмиш, гашиш, топчан, чинара.

There are also words used in science and academia such as: бейт (a couplet in Turkic-Persidic poetry), дастан (a genre of epics), изафет (Ezāfe).

Exoticisms include манту, курпача, плов, танур, хоуз, див, дутор, най, самбуса, чапан, эзоры.

Both Russian and Tajik speakers are served by the following words to address unfamiliar people and acquaintances.

Calques are not very numerous and are often used with a humorous undertone. For example, хунуковато (from Tajik хунук meaning cold) in place of standard Russian холодновато.

There are also words used by Tajiki Russian speakers that have long had their own standard Russian equivalents:

Tajik expressions are often used: хайрият – к счастью, наконец-то (досл. добро), тавба – досл. раскаяние.

In youth jargon, Russian suffixes, prefixes, and endings are attached to Tajik stems, or a Tajik noun is paired with a Russian verb in a phrase. For example: гапы бросать – to converse from Tajik гап meaning speech, conversation (.)

After the end of the Soviet period,  many Russian words were given Tajik equivalents. For example,  «велосипед» — «дучарха», «команда» — «даста», «фронт» — «джабха», «ракета» «мушак».

Colloquial speech has retained almost all Russian borrowed elements (with the exception of words of purely Soviet semantics). Most borrowings, especially colloquial ones, change their phonetics and acquire a sound that is more suitable for the Tajik ear. In most cases, this means, first of all, a change of stress (in the Tajik language, a fixed stress on the last syllable) – картошка, майка; loss of a soft sign that is absent in Tajik – апрел, контрол, change of the sound "ц" to the sound "с" – сирк (цирк), консерт (концерт), frequent replacement of the sound "А" with the sound "О" – мошин (машина), the sound "Ы" for the sound "И" – вибор (выбор), disappearance of the ending to zero – конфет. However, a number of words remain unchanged: март, газета.

A very noticeable feature of Tajikistani Russian is the usage of Tajik auxiliary verbs кардан (to do) and доштан (to have, possess) in mixed speech. For example: ждать доштан; успеть кардан instead of расида тавонистан; договориться кардан instead of мувофикат хосил кардан; завтракать кардан instead of ноништа кардан. Additionally, утюг кардан (Standard Russian: гладить); телефон кардан (Standard Russian: звонить); уборка кардан (Standard Russian: убирать).

Mixed speech also includes common Russian substitutions and additions either alongside or in place of other Tajik words such as обычный or простой instead of одати; морожени instead of яхмос; туалет instead of мабраз; серьёзный instead of джидди.

Calques are also a very frequent domain in the usage of Tajik(istani) Russian:
 The suffix -чи which creates nouns denoting the doers of an action, a name of a profession, or a person by their characteristics. For example: колхозчи to mean колхозник (kolkhoznik, collective farmer) in Standard Russian; тракторчи instead of тракторист to mean a tractor driver. Others include: таксичи/таксистчи instead of таксист; and автомобилчи instead of автомобилист.
 The suffix -дор which creates a noun denoting an object possessing something or some quality. For example: камерадор meaning "possessing a camera" in reference to a mobile telephone. In other varieties of Russian such as Kyrgyz Russian, the word сотка is used for a mobile phone whereas мобильник and мобильный телефон are used more in Russia proper.

Uzbekistani Russian 
Recent years have brought official government introductions of Uzbek replacement words such as наљлиёт or юк ташиш instead of транспортировка; фуљаро or табаалик instead of граждан. At the same time, some little-used Uzbek words fall into disfavour in comparison to Russian counterparts: чеснок in favour over саримсок; тарелка in favour over ликопча; очки in favour over кузойнок.

There are also words commonly used in Uzbekistani Russian not frequently used in that of Russia:  вилоят, лаган, хурджук, хоким, юзбоши, атола, казы, димляма. 

Various mixed phrases include: мен хорошийман, девушкахон, Иван-ака, закяз-самса

Other

Alaskan 

Ninilchik Russian is an isolated dialect of Russian spoken in Alaska.

Israeli 

The Russian language in Israel, spoken by Russian repatriates, differs from the Russian language in Russia. Differences range from individual words (such as «йом ришон», "yom rishon", instead of «воскресенье» for Sunday; «матнас»,  instead of «клуб» for club) and expressions (such as «брать автобус», "take a bus", instead of «ехать на автобусе», "go by bus"; «делать армию», "make an army" or "do army", instead of «служить в армии», "serve in the army"), to phonetics and phraseology. This variant is called by Israelis and scholars "Rusit"/"Русит", from the Hebrew name of the Russian language.

Vocabulary 
Russian dialects usually preserve many archaic words and forms which dropped out of use or were replaced with Church Slavonic counterparts. In North Russian there are about 200 words of Uralic origin.

References

Text corpora of Russian dialects 
 Ustja River Basin Corpus
 Corpus of Rogovatka dialect
 Corpus of Spiridonova Buda dialect
 Corpus of Malinino dialect
 Opochka Dialect Corpus